Mario Guerci (14 January 1913 – 13 October 1990) was an Argentine rower. He competed in the men's eight event at the 1948 Summer Olympics.

References

External links
 

1913 births
1990 deaths
Argentine male rowers
Olympic rowers of Argentina
Rowers at the 1948 Summer Olympics
Rowers from Buenos Aires
Pan American Games medalists in rowing
Pan American Games gold medalists for Argentina
Rowers at the 1951 Pan American Games
20th-century Argentine people